In mathematics, given a field , nonnegative integers , and a matrix , a rank decomposition or rank factorization of  is a factorization of  of the form , where  and , where  is the rank of .

Existence 

Non-uniqueness 
If  is a rank factorization, taking  and 
 gives another rank factorization for any invertible matrix  of compatible dimensions. 

Construction

Rank factorization from reduced row echelon forms  

Example 

Consider the matrix

 is in reduced echelon form.

It is straightforward to check that

Proof 
So ,  being the  identity matrix. We will show now that .

Transforming  into its reduced row echelon form  amounts to left-multiplying by a matrix  which is a product of elementary matrices, so , where . We thus have , and since  is invertible this implies , and the proof is complete.

Singular value decomposition 
If  then one can also construct a full-rank factorization of  via a singular value decomposition

Consequences

rank(A) = rank(AT) 

Proof: To see why this is true, let us first define rank to mean column rank. Since , it follows that .

This proves that .

This proves .

Notes

References

 
 
 
 
 

Matrix decompositions
Linear algebra